Gangavathar is a 1942 Indian Tamil-language Hindu mythological film directed by C. K. Sathasivam popularly known as C. K. Sachi and produced by Sundaram Sound Studio, Madras. The film starred N. C. Vasanthakokilam.

Plot 
The film is based on the episode in Hindu mythology related to the descent of river Ganges to earth.

Cast 
The list is adapted from the film's review article in The Hindu.

Male cast
Nagercoil K. Mahadevan – Bhagiratha
C. V. V. Panthulu – Shiva
B. R. Panthulu
P. G. Venkatesan – Narada
D. Balasubramaniam
M. Lakshmanan
R. Rajagopalan
Kali N. Rathnam
T. S. Durairaj
M. R. Swaminathan

Female cast
N. C. Vasanthakokilam – Ganga
T. S. Damayanthi – Parvati
V. N. Janaki – Heavenly maiden
S. K. Padmadevi
T. V. Lakshmi
C. T. Rajakantham
P. R. Mangalam
T.V.A. Poorani

Production 
The film was produced by Sundaram Sound Studio, Adyar, Chennai.

Soundtrack 
List of songs sung by N. C. Vasanthakokilam in this film.
 "Paanganacholai Alangkaaram"
 "Kalaivaani AruL Purivaai"
 "Aanandham ALavillaa Miga Anandham"
 "Idhuvenna Vedhanai"
 "Jaya Jaya Buvanapathe Paalaya Jaya Karunajalathe"
 "Aanandha Maaya Vaanulagidhe"
 "Kaavin Manohara Kaatchiyin Maanbe"

Reception 
Writing in 2012, film historian Randor Guy said "The film did fairly well mainly due to its music and NCV's songs."

References

External links 

1940s Tamil-language films
1942 films
Hindu mythological films
Indian black-and-white films